The 2015 season for the  cycling team began in January at the Vuelta al Táchira. The team participated in UCI Continental Circuits and UCI World Tour events when given a wildcard invitation.

In light of the doping scandals which took place within the team, during the 2013 and 2014 season, Neri Sottoli dropped their title-sponsorship for the 2015 season and Luca Scinto left the team. Chinese construction company SouthEast Space Frame Co. became title sponsor of the team.

2015 roster

Riders who joined the team for the 2015 season

Riders who left the team during or after the 2014 season

Season victories

National, Continental and World champions 2015

Footnotes

References

External links
 

2015 road cycling season by team